Grāpple is the registered brand name for a commercially marketed brand of Fuji or Gala apple that has been soaked in a solution of concentrated grape flavor (methyl anthranilate) and water in order to make the flesh taste like a Concord grape. This solution does not add additional sugars or caloric content, nor does it affect the nutritional value of a standard apple.  All ingredients are approved by the US Department of Agriculture and the US Food and Drug Administration, with the production process licensed by the Washington State Department of Agriculture. 

Contrary to what the name implies, it is an externally flavored fruit product, not a true hybrid of two fruits. The company's use of plastic clampshell packaging has received criticism, notably from a March 2019 investigation by CBC Marketplace. Grāpple's use of plastic packaging was voted the most egregious example of excessive consumer plastic packaging in a 2019 Canadian poll conducted by Marketplace.

References

External links

Apple dishes
Grape
Apple production in Washington (state)